Genye Gewog (Dzongkha: དགེ་བསྙེན་) is a gewog (village block) of Thimphu District, Bhutan.

References 

Gewogs of Bhutan
Thimphu District